The 1984 Grand Prix de Tennis de Toulouse was a men's tennis tournament played on indoor carpet courts in Toulouse, France that was part of the Regular Series of the 1984 Grand Prix tennis circuit. It was the third edition of the tournament and was held from 19 November until 25 November 1984. Mark Dickson won the singles title.

Finals

Singles

 Mark Dickson defeated  Heinz Günthardt, 7–6, 6–4
 It was Dickson's 2nd singles title of the year and of his career.

Doubles

 Jan Gunnarsson /  Michael Mortensen defeated  Pavel Složil /  Tim Wilkison, 6–4, 6–2

References

External links
 ITF tournament edition details

Grand Prix de Tennis de Toulouse
Grand Prix de Tennis de Toulouse
Grand Prix de Tennis de Toulouse
Grand Prix de Tennis de Toulouse